Mahmud Shah Durrani (1769 – 18 April 1829), also known as Shah Mahmud, or Mahmud Shah Abdali, was the ruler of the Durrani Empire between 1801 and 1803, and again between 1809 and 1818. From 1818 to 1829, he was the emir of Herat. An ethnic Sadduzai, a division of the Popalzai clan of the Durrani Pashtuns, he was the son of Timur Shah Durrani and grandson of Ahmad Shah Durrani.

Early life
Mahmud Shah was born in 1769, the second son of Timur Shah Durrani. His mother was an unknown concubine of Yusufzai stock. He was raised with his brothers, most prominently Zaman Shah Durrani and Shah Shuja Durrani, and was appointed emir of Herat by his father at 8 years old.

Death of Timur Shah
Timur Shah died on 20 May 1793, triggering a succession crisis within the Empire. Mahmud, the powerful Herati emir, allied with his brother Humayun in Kandahar against Zaman Shahzadeh, the late Shah's eldest son and designated successor, who had summoned all rival claimants to Kabul. Zaman had them locked up for 5 days, starving them until they submitted and recognized him as Shah of the Empire. Eventually they all did, including Mahmud.

When Zaman Shah sent their brother Shuja Shahzadeh to deal with him, despite Mahmud's alliance with Humayun, Mahmud did nothing to assist his ally, reaffirming his loyalty to the new Shah. For this, Mahmud was confirmed as the ruler of Herat, but now as the Shah's vassal.

Ruler of Herat
Mahmud Shah had ruled Herat under the suzerainty of Zaman Shah Durrani, however, he attempted multiple revolts and efforts for power during his rule of Herat.

Zaman Shah's invasion of Herat 
Zaman Shah, seeing the threat of the Persians, had decided to try to regain control of Herat and establish a loyal governor against the Persians. This was in direct response to them demanding the complete lands of Mashad, Herat, and even Balkh, one year prior in 1795. As a result, he marched against Mahmud Shah and met him near Ghirisk, and had defeated Mahmud Shah. Zaman Shah went on to siege Herat; however, the city had held out, and the two brothers had held an agreement. Mahmud Shah would recognize Zaman Shah as ruler of the Durrani Empire, in return, Zaman Shah had recognized Mahmud Shah as the governor of Herat. They had agreed to these terms. However, nobody had informed Mahmud's son, Kamran Mirza, of the peace agreement; as a result, when he saw Zaman Shah withdrawing his armies, Kamran tailed his armies. However, once Kamran had left (with the main portion for the army off defending the city), Timuri Khan, the garrison commander, had led an open revolt, and opened the gates to Zaman Shah, having heard of this, Mahmud Shah and Kamran had fled to Tehran for shelter to the Persian court.

Return of Mahmud Shah 
During Zaman Shah's campaigns in Punjab against the Sikhs, the British had seen this as a threat, where Zaman Shah could align the Muslim powers of India against the British in a coalition, as a result, the British had given 10,000 rupees to the Shah of Persia. Seeing opportunity, Mahmud Shah, along with his brother, Firoz Mirza, had mobilized and marched on Farah and Herat. Instead of the Shah joining directly, he supported Mahmud and Firoz. The two princes captured Farah, and also defeated Qaizar Mirza, Zaman Shah's son, and also besieged Herat. Zaman Shah had abandoned his Punjab campaign and pulled back to Peshawar, the Sikhs recaptured Lahore as a result of this. Despite Herat in large support of Mahmud Shah, Qaizar had held out. In an attempt to undermine the Persian alliance, Qaizar's Wazir had sent a letter to Mahmud Shah's ally, Mir Ali, and had offered to assassinate Mahmud Shah. However Mahmud's spies intercepted this message, Mahmud Shah and Kamran were completely deceived, and fled in the dead of the night. The following morning, seeing that Mahmud and Kamran had fled, chaos erupted in the camp, and taking advantage of this, Qaizar had marched out and routed the Persian army from besieging Herat. Following this victory, Zaman Shah had returned to Punjab, recapturing Lahore and also placed Ranjit Singh, as an attempt to divide the Sikhs as the nawab of Lahore, and Zaman had returned to Peshawar.

Second Return of Mahmud Shah 
After the execution of Payandah Khan Barakzai, his sons fled to the Persian court, pledging loyalty to Mahmud Shah and persuading him to take up arms and attempt a second campaign against Zaman Shah. When Zaman Shah went to Lahore in the spring of 1800 to deal with the rebellious Ranjit Singh, Mahmud Shah, and his followers including Fateh Khan had marched on Ghirishk, they had raised an army of several thousand, prominently Barakzai tribesmen, and marched on Kandahar. Zaman Shah made even more enemies after the governor of Kashmir had rebelled, but came to Peshawar under safe conduct to negotiate, however only to be tortured and executed. When Zaman Shah's brother, Saidal Khan, head of the defense of Kandahar had heard what Zaman Shah had done, he opened the gates of Kandahar to Mahmud Shah and his army. Mahmud Shah had reconsolidated, and marched on Ghazni against Mahmud Shah. Zaman Shah had returned to Kabul. However, leaving most of his men and artillery in Peshawar. He realized the dire situation and reality of the revolt, Mahmud Shah and Zaman Shah had finally met at Muqur, a post between Kandahar and Ghazni. Before the battle started, Ahmad Khan, an ethnic Nurzai, had declared his support for Mahmud Shah and defected to Mahmud's side. The Ghilzais around Ghazni had also surrounded Zaman Shah's line of retreat, as a result, panic quickly spread and Zaman's army fell apart. Zaman Shah and fellow supporters had fled, taking asylum with Mullah Ashiq, a local Pir. Ashiq welcomed them, but had secretly sent a messenger to Mahmud Shah on their whereabouts. When Zaman Shah found out, he attempted to convince Ashiq, offering treasure and other rewards, however, this was ignored. Realizing the fate that would come to him, Zaman Shah had still tried to deny Mahmud's legitimacy, hiding the Koh-i-Noor diamond in the wall of the Qal'a where it remained until Shuja Shah Durrani had recovered it years later. Payinda Khan's sons arrived later with a surgeon, and had Zaman Shah's eyes lanced, leaving him blinded for life.

First Reign of the Durrani Empire

Mahmud Shah had marched on Kabul, where he was then proclaimed King of the Durrani Empire in 1801. Zaman Shah was confined in the upper palace of the Bala Hissar, Kabul.

State of the Durrani Empire and rebellion of Al-Rahim 
By the time Mahmud Shah had ascended to the Durrani throne, the Durrani Empire was in great disarray, with the kingdom divided into a plethora of semi independent chiefdoms. Zaman Shah had later escaped his prison and rejoiced with his brother, Shuja, where they both took up arms from Peshawar, and tried to remove Mahmud from power, however, Shah Mahmud prevailed and defeated the coalition. The Khan of Bukhara also attempted to invade Balkh, however this invasion attempt was repelled by Mahmud Shah. In the wake of this, Al-Rahim, a claimed descendant of Mirwais Hotak had declared an open revolt against Mahmud Shah, occupied Kandahar, and besieged Ghazni. While a second army marched to attack Kabul. Both battles were met on the same day, in the first battle at Shewaki, Mahmud Shah's army had massacred the Tokhi Ghilzais, and made a skull pyramid to celebrate his victory. The Second battle took place at Pul-i-Sangi, on the road from Ghazni to Kabul. which led to the death of Al-Rahim and the destruction of the rebellion of the Ghilzais.

Instability and civil strife 
In 1801, an Anglo-Persian treaty was signed, the treaty termed to prevent Afghan expansion into Punjab, and for the Persians to strike if they did. In 1803, the Persians had struck Mashhad, the seat of Durrani Empire in Khorasan. News of the loss had caused massive backlash among Sunni religious leaders in Kabul, who in return incited attacks on the Qizilbash, and different Shi'a communities in Afghanistan. The riots were used as an excuse to try to curtail power from the Turkic Qizilbash, who had great influence in the Durrani Empire at this point, mostly from Timur Shah and his efforts. Members of the Durrani court and council had referred to the Qizilbash as Persians, although rather being ethnically Turkic. The Sunni and Durrani council had argued that if Persia was to strike Herat, the predominantly Shi'a Qizilbash would rise up in effort against the Durrani Empire. These campaigns had torn the empire of its stability even more, with the dire situation it was in.

In the first week of 1803, while Fateh Khan and the Qizilbash were in Kandahar quelling rebellions and attempting to maintain the stability of the empire, prominent anti Shi'a figure Mukhtar Al-Daula, had denounced the Shi'a faith, regarding them as "blasphemers and heretics". And he called for the expulsion of all Qizilbash and Shi'as from the capital. This led to massive clashes with the Shi'a communities in Kabul and the Qizilbash. Mukhtar had declared a Fatwa against the Shi'as. The following Friday during congregational prayers, Khawaja Khanji had read the Fatwah out to the crowd. Once prayers had ended, the now forming mob had begun looting Shi'a and Qizilbash homes. Shah Mahmud was terrified of this, and had barricaded himself in the Bala Hisar, recalling Fateh Khan and his Qizilbash from Kandahar. When Mukhtar and Khawaja realized that Shah Mahmud was not going to quell the riots, they had begin calling upon their followers, as thousands of followers formulated with the mob, including the Ghilzai tribesmen. They poured into the city of Kabul and had marched on the stronghold of Chindawal. However, the Qizilbash were prepared and had fired from the Mahala. The siege would continue for a month in stalemate before Shah Mahmud had finally ordered the arrest of Mukhtar and other ring leaders. A prominent figure, Sher Mohammad Khan had known of Shah Mahmud's plans, and had ordered Khawaja to mount a diversionary attack on Chindawal and the Bala Hisar, he then escaped out of the city from this.

Deposition by Shah Shujah 

Sher Muhammad Khan has escaped from Mahmud Shah's grip, and went to Peshawar to meet with Shah Mahmud's brother, Shah Shujah Durrani. He offered to help Shujah to depose Shah Mahmud in exchange for being made Wazir of the Durrani Empire. Shuja had eventually agreed, and marched on Kabul, and on 12 July 1803, had defeated Shah Mahmud, aided by Durrani defectors and supporters of Khwaja Khanji. The day after his victory, Shah Shujah had entered the bala hissar, accompanied by Sher Muhammad Khan. Zaman Shah Durrani was also freed from prison, treated well by Shah Shujah, the pir who had also betrayed Shah Zaman was hunted down and executed. After Shah Shujah had restored order in the capital of Kabul. He sent nephew, Qaisar to Kandahar where Wazir Fateh khan and Shah Mahmud's son, Kamran, was holding out. Fateh Khan had offered to submit to Shah Shujah if the king restored his confiscated estates and his family's tax-free status. Shah Shuja had agreed and Fateh Khan had surrendered Kandahar to him. However Kamran had fled to Herat.

Reign of Shah Shujah
From 1807-08, Shah Shuja was forced into multiple campaigns around his kingdom to hold it apart, with Persian threats at Herat. Taking advantage of the Shah's absence, Mukhtar Al-Daula and Khwaja Khanji had revolted in Sindh. Kashmir had also revolted, and even Now Wazir Fateh Khan had deserted and pledged loyalty to Shah Qaisar. This rebel army was however defeated on 3 March 1808 outside of Peshawar, many of the ring leaders including Sher Muhammad Khan had been slain, likely amidst the battle. Khwaja and Qaisar had survived and fled to Kohistan, while Shah Mahmud had returned and joined forces with Fateh Khan in Kandahar. Kabul had fallen back to Shah Shuja's hands, and he defeated Shah Mahmud near Qalati Ghilji. Instead of pursuing and attacking Kandahar, Shah Shuja returned to Peshawar to meet with a British East India company diplomatic mission.

Return of Shah Mahmud 

Shah Shuja did not trust many of his advisors, this had included Akram Khan, where he had believed that they may have been in touch with his rival, Mahmud Shah Durrani. Akram Khan was deployed to the rebellion of Kashmir, rather not deploying him to deal with Shah Mahmud's march on Kabul, fearing he might defect. The Kashmir campaign would end in disaster, due to the kings ally, the mutawalli of Muzaffarabad, had sent his men through a difficult mountainous path, which as a result his lines were cut off and his force was annihilated. The situation was worsened for Shah Shuja as Mahmud had marched and occupied Kabul. Shah Shujah gathered the remnants of his army, and in June 1809, set out to Jalalabad to confront Shah Mahmud in battle. Mahmud Shah confronted Shah Shujah on the old Kabul-Jalalabad Road and defeated Shah Shujah, who was forced to flee following this defeat. He made multiple attempts to try to recapture the throne, but had given up and had fled to British India.

Second Reign of the Durrani Empire
With the victory of Shah Mahmud, Fateh Khan was re-appointed as wazir; he used this powerful position to dispose of his enemies and key governors, in turn he replaced them with close family of his, with his half-brother, Pur Dil Khan appointed as governor of Kandahar. Pur dil's full brothers were also appointed as governors of Ghazni, Bamyan, and Kalat. Pur Dil's youngest brother was also appointed as minister of foreign affairs to Shah Mahmud. Fateh Khan had also appointed his younger full brother, Mohammad Azim Khan, as governor of Peshawar. Shah Mahmud had also led a campaign with the Sikhs to try to recapture Kashmir. He forged an alliance with Ranjit Sing, the ruler of the Sikh empire, and had offered him half of the provinces revenues for military assistance. Ranjit Singh had then double-crossed Shah Mahmud, forcing Attock to submit to his authority. When Fateh Khan heard of this, he attempted to recapture the city, but was repulsed by the Sikhs. Shah Mahmud's alliance with the Sikhs had also brought unpopularity and strife, as the Sunni faction at his court, as a result when Shah Mahmud and Fateh Khan were campaigning, followers of Khwaja Khanji, Sayyid 'Ata, and Sayyid Ashraf had rebelled and placed Abbas Mirza, another son of Timur Shah Durrani on the Durrani throne. The Qizilbash in Shah Mahmud's army mutinied when they heard of this coup, and returned to Kabul. Seeing their kingdom under threat, Shah Mahmud and Fateh Khan had to break off their campaigns against the Sikhs and had to return to Peshawar to mobilize a force to march to Kabul. Shah Mahmud sent them quickly to Kabul, where he had fought multiple skirmishes outside the capital, Shah Mahmud had emerged victorious and had defeated the rebellion against him. the ringleaders were captured and sentenced to death by execution by being crushed by an elephant. Khwaja Khanji escaped execution and fled to Kohistan. Fateh Khan's half-brother, Dost Mohammad Khan with a corps of Qizilbash to wipe out the remaining rebel pockets, and had laid waste to much of lands around Kohistan, burning crops and orchards. When Khwaja had still refused to submit, Dost used a sign of flattery, promising to pardon him and open a royal marriage, having lured Khwaja, Dost had beheaded Khwaja and other leaders of the movement. Khwaja's two sons had however, escaped this.

Confrontations with Persia 
In 1816, Firoz-Al-Din had revolted, capitalizing on Persia's weakened state after the Treaty of Gulistan. Firoz had occupied Ghurian, however, Fath-Ali Shah Qajar had marched out to meet him, and had regained control of Ghurian and forced Herat to recognize Persian Suzerainty. In 1818, Firoz had revolted again when Fath-Ali had demanded more tribute, Firoz would appeal to Shah Mahmud for assistance. Wazir Fateh Khan, seeing an opportunity to expand his power base more and continue the Barakzai monopoly over the Durrani Empire, had accepted Firoz's offer and marched to Herat with a raised army of 15,000. Also accompanied by Dost Mohammad Khan and the Dil brothers. Fateh had tricked Firoz into letting him and a contingent of soldiers to enter the city, where Fateh Khan had then ordered the arresting of Firoz, and the execution of many high officials. The city gates were opened, and Herat was sacked, with mass killings, and rapings in ordination from this. In a twist of events, one of Shah Mahmud's daughters were among the ones raped. Once order was re-established, Shah Mahmud's daughter sent a letter to Shah Mahmud himself, demanding that they uphold the family honor by taking revenge. Kamran, having heard of this had swore of revenge against Dost Mohammad Khan, however Dost had fled to Kashmir for his life after hearing of Kamran's threat. Now ruler of Herat, Fateh Khan had expelled Persia's ambassador and had told him to inform Fath-Ali that Shah Mahmud was now the Sovereign. Shah Mahmud, having heard of this, was terrified that Persia might use this as a Casus belli against him to march on Herat. Shah Mahmud sent Kamran, repudiating Fateh Khan's behaviour and reinstating the ambassador as noted in the letter. However, the governor of Mashhad had marched out to reclaim Herat. In a engaged battle with the Persians, Fateh was knocked off his horse with a musket shot, his soldiers, believing he was dead had returned to Herat. The Persian army also retreated, waiting for reinforcements from Fath-Ali. Shah Mahmud's letter arrived on time and Fateh Khan had agreed to not engage the Persian army again, reinstating the Persian ambassador and reopening diplomatic relations. Kamran had then decreed that Fateh Khan would be stripped of the position of Wazir, and had ordered him to surrender the city. Fateh Khan, had however defied this, and had bragged, "I twice placed Mahmud on the throne." He added, "[A]nd his kingdom is now in the hands of my kinsmen; who is Kamraun, therefore. That in a dream he should think of injuring me."

Trial and Execution of Fateh Khan 

After facing defiance by Fateh Khan to hand over Herat, Kamran had returned to Kabul, giving a detailed account of what occurred in Herat, with Fateh Khan's "rebellion", pillaging of Herat, and the rape of Shah Mahmud's daughter. Shah Mahmud, now furious of these accounted claims had ordered Kamran to set out for Herat to take the city by any means possible and to punish Fateh Khan. Kamran had mobilized a substantial army and marched to Herat, he also sent diplomatic envoys to Fateh Khan, pretending to be as a form of congratulation from Shah Mahmud on the conquest of the city and victory over Persia. Kamran Shah had arrived at Herat and invited Fateh Khan to a meal. Despite his advisors telling him not to attend, Fateh Khan had ignored this, knowing it would be disrespectful. Fateh Khan went to breakfast, and saw all his enemies there. Despite this, he did not leave and sat to eat. As the meal continued to progress, many of his enemies and the guests took turns insulting and hurling abuse at him. Fateh Khan had then stood and presented himself out as he did not want to stay among all this disrespect toward him, he was pinned toward a tablecloth, and 'Ata Mohammad Khan thrust his dagger into the Wazir's eyes, blinding him. He was then thrown into prison a few days later, where his eyes were plucked out and his eye-sockets were cauterized with a red-hot iron. After months of prison, Fateh Khan was sent to Ghazni to be judged by Shah Mahmud himself. He appeared on trial before Shah Mahmud and many of his enemies from different chiefdoms. Shah Mahmud had ordered Fateh Khan to bring his brothers before him to swear fealty, promising he would spare his life on this condition. Fateh Khan, believing that his brothers would face the same fate as him refused and claimed that he never wanted to usurp the throne from Shah Mahmud. The King retaliated by striking Fateh Khan with his sword, whereupon many other members of the trial had taken turns cutting off Fateh Khan's limbs. Fateh Khan was said to not have uttered a single cry during this. Shah Mahmud had then cut off his head, putting Fateh Khan out of his misery, and his body was disposed of by being placed in a carpet and buried.

Fall of Shah Mahmud 
With the execution of Fateh Khan, Shah Mahmud's power, already fragile, had crumbled. Fateh Khan's brothers, who were prominently dispersed in governorship throughout the empire, rebelled when they heard of what happened. Now determined to finally end the Sadozai Dynasty in Afghanistan. The headship of the Barakzai dynasty, better known as the Mohammadzai, had passed down to Fateh Khan's brother, Mohammad Azim Khan. In further attempts to try to gain support or possibly to replace Shah Mahmud, he tried to enlist the help of Shah Shuja Durrani. But the ex-king had pressed heavy demands, so Azim Khan searched elsewhere, finding another of Timur Shah's sons, Ayub Shah Durrani. Ayub was reported to have said; "Make me king, and permit money to be coined in my name and the whole power and resources of the kingdom may rest with yourself; my ambition will be satisfied with bread, and the title of King". Azim Khan restarted war with the Sikhs in Kashmir as well. Dost Mohammad Khan, believing that deposing Shah Mahmud was more important, had marched on Kabul with a small force of Qizilbash While Azim Khan kept most of his army at Peshawar to continue war with the Sikhs. Shah Mahmud, having heard that Dost Mohammad was marching to Kabul, left Kandahar to defend his capital from the Barakzais. However, when he had reached Ghazni, news came that Kandahar fell to Sher Dil Khan. Seeing himself being slowly surrounded, Mahmud remained in Ghazni. Shah Mahmud sent Kamran's son, Jahangir Mirza, alongside 'Ata Mohammad Khan to Kabul. Unbeknownst to him was that 'Ata Khan was in contact with Dost Mohammad Khan, who offered to change sides on the condition that all of Payendah Khan's sons swear an oath on the Quran to not put him the death for putting out Fateh Khan's eyes. Dost Mohammad Khan sent him the oaths. 'Ata Khan had then left the Bala Hissar on the context of attacking the enemy lines, he then defected. However when he arrived to where Dost Mohammad Khan was alongside his camp, his eyes were gouged out with a dagger by Pir Mohammad Khan, the youngest of the Peshawar Sardars who did not sign the Oath. Dost Mohammad Khan then occupied the lower Bala Hissar, Jahangir had then escaped to Ghazni. Realizing the situation was not to his favour, Shah Mahmud had fled with his royal retainers and his family through fled to Herat through the Hazarajat. Ending Shah Mahmud's second reign.

Rule in Herat

Restored Reign, Infighting, and Iranian Invasion (1819–1823) 
After the Barakzais expelled him from Qandahar in 1818, Mahmud Shah fled to Farah and then to Herat. Reportedly, he reached Herat with only 11 men under his command. Mahmud Shah, when reaching Herat, turned over its administration to his son Kamran, who also consulted him on political matters. Ata Mohammad Khan Alakozai also became the vazir of Herat.

In 1819, Saleh Khan, a noble who gained favour with Kamran, tried to convince him to reconquer Qandahar. However, Kamran said he didn't have enough money and blamed Saleh Khan for his past troubles. Mahmud and Kamran Shah both united to extort Saleh Khan, and in response Saleh Khan secretly sent a letter to Firuz al-Din Mirza (the previous ruler of Herat who was in exile in Mashhad), and invited him to claim the throne. Together they both marched on Farah, a city in the south controlled by a supporter of Kamran, and captured it. Saleh Khan was able to make a compromise where he would control Farah and Firuz al-Din Mirza would return into exile in Mashhad.

Ever since 1816, Herat had refused to pay tribute to Persia. Kamran Shah made excuse after excuse on why he wasn't able to pay. In addition to that, Herat had actively supported the revolt of Banyad Khan Hazara (the Hazara chieftain of Jam and Bakharz). On 25 June 1821, Qajar force of 3,000 shattered Banyad Khan's Jamshidi, Hazara, and Firozkohi troops at the battle of Kariz. He was pursued into the lands of the Chahar Aimaq. In 1822, Iranian forces invaded Herat and besieged the city, aiming to restore Firuz al-Din to the throne. In the process, Qilich Khan Timuri (one of the leaders on the Iranian side and the autonomous governor of Khvaf) was killed during a battle on 22 May. (Ahmad Ali Kohzad reports the same thing except he falsely identifies Qilich Khan Timuri as Khalil Khan Taymani, while Karimi makes it clear it was Qilich Khan Timuri.) In the end, Herat withstood the siege by Iranian forces. However, although the Qajar troops had ravaged the province dearly it doesn't seem to have much of an effect on Kamran, as within a year or two he was to attack Qandahar.

Fighting with Kamran Shah, deposition, and death (1823–1829) 
In 1824, Kamran Shah attempted to conquer Qandahar, leaving the administration of Herat in the hands of Husain Khan and Mustafa Khan Zori. However, while Kamran was on route to Qandahar, allies of Firuz al-Din placed him back on the throne. However, Mahmud was soon able to convince them to desert Firuz and install him instead, thus ending Firuz al-Din's 18 day rule. When Kamran Shah returned from Qandahar, Mahmud refused to let him back in. As a result, Kamran, with the support of the Qandahar Sardars, besieged Herat. Mahmud then recruited the help of Saleh Khan, who sent Mustafa Khan Zori to break the siege of the city. They were successful, but Mustafa Khan then turned against his allies, imprisoned Saleh Khan, and forced Mahmud Shah out the city. However, Kamran and Mahmud Shah then united against Mustafa Khan and within a month deposed him. In the winter of 1824 Mustafa Khan was executed. After Mustafa Khan's death, Mahmud Shah and Kamran Shah immediately started fighting each other for control. Mahmud fled to Khwaja Ansari's tomb at Gazurgah, and then 6 months later fled across the Murghab to seek the aid of the Jamshidi tribes.

Kamran Shah needed help, so he requested the aid of Iran. In July 1826 Hasan Ali Mirza Qajar sent 6,000 or 10,000 men with 4 guns to the aid of Kamran Shah. When they reached Herat, they combined with 2,000 of Kamran's troops and marched towards the Murghab. However, spies leaked Kamran's plans to Mahmud, who set up an ambush. The Aimaqs and Uzbeks completely routed the Iranians, and Mahmud marched onward to Herat. However, Mahmud refused to storm the citadel, instead camping outside the citadel, meaning that "all the benefit of the Badghis victory quickly dissipated" and his siege of Herat failed. Mahmud fled to the Hazaras of Qala-e Naw but Kamran sent an army after him. The Herati army starved the Hazaras of supplied and forced into handing over Mahmud. However Mahmud fled to Lash rather than being taken by Kamran. In 1827, Kamran took pity on Mahmud and invited him back to Herat. In 1828-29 Ata Mohammad Khan Alakozai died. His son Sardar Din Mohammad Khan Alakozai then succeeded him as vazir. However, due to the courtiers being against this appointment, he was forced to give up the viziership to his cousin, Yar Mohammad Khan Alakozai. The first act Yar Mohammad Khan did in 1829 was to depose Mahmud Shah, who died shortly after. Kamran then became the ruler.

See also
Durrani Empire
Shah Shuja Durrani
Zaman Shah Durrani
Timur Shah Durrani
Ahmad Shah Durrani
Battle of Nimla (1809)

References

External links

The British Library – Chronology: from the emergence of the Afghan Kingdom to the Mission of Mountstuart Elphistone, 1747–1809

1769 births
1829 deaths
19th-century Afghan monarchs
Emirs of Afghanistan
Mahmud Shah
Pashtun people
19th-century Afghan politicians
19th-century monarchs in Asia